In Greek mythology, the name Myrto (Ancient Greek: Μυρτώ) may refer to one of the following characters:

 Myrto, a possible eponym for the Myrtoan Sea.
Myrto, one of the Maenads who followed Dionysus in the Indian War.
 Myrto, an Amazon and one of the possible mothers of Myrtilus by Hermes.
 Myrto, daughter of Menoitios of Opus, sister to Patroclus. She had a daughter Eucleia by Heracles.

Notes

References 
Nonnus of Panopolis, Dionysiaca translated by William Henry Denham Rouse (1863-1950), from the Loeb Classical Library, Cambridge, MA, Harvard University Press, 1940.  Online version at the Topos Text Project.
Nonnus of Panopolis, Dionysiaca. 3 Vols. W.H.D. Rouse. Cambridge, MA., Harvard University Press; London, William Heinemann, Ltd. 1940-1942. Greek text available at the Perseus Digital Library.
Pausanias, Description of Greece with an English Translation by W.H.S. Jones, Litt.D., and H.A. Ormerod, M.A., in 4 Volumes. Cambridge, MA, Harvard University Press; London, William Heinemann Ltd. 1918. . Online version at the Perseus Digital Library
Pausanias, Graeciae Descriptio. 3 vols. Leipzig, Teubner. 1903.  Greek text available at the Perseus Digital Library.
Realencyclopädie der Classischen Altertumswissenschaft, Band XVI, Halbband 31, Molatzes-Myssi (1933), s. 1167 (in German)

Maenads
Companions of Dionysus
Amazons (Greek mythology)
Women of Heracles
Locrian characters in Greek mythology